Caracolus is a genus of air-breathing land snails, terrestrial pulmonate gastropod mollusks in the family Solaropsidae.

Species 
Species within the genus Caracolus include:
 Caracolus albilabris Lamarck, 1816
 † Caracolus aquilonaris Bishop, 1979 
 Caracolus bicolor Lamarck, 1816
 Caracolus bizonalis (Deshayes, 1850)
 Caracolus caracolla Oken
 Caracolus carinatus (Röding, 1798)
 Caracolus carocolla (Linnaeus, 1758)
 Caracolus cimarron Espinosa, Fernández-Velázquez & Ortea, 2016
 Caracolus marginella (Gmelin, 1791)
Species brought into synonymy
 Caracolus oculatus Montfort, 1810: synonym of Caracolus carocolla'' (Linnaeus, 1758)

References

External links
 Montfort P. [Denys de. (1808-1810). Conchyliologie systématique et classification méthodique des coquilles. Paris: Schoell. Vol. 1: pp. lxxxvii + 409 [1808]. Vol. 2: pp. 676 + 16]
 Albers, J. C. (1850). Die Heliceen nach natürlicher Verwandtschaft systematisch geordnet. Berlin: Enslin. 262 pp., available online at https://www.biodiversitylibrary.org/page/11965983 page(s): 120
 MNHN, Paris: Caracolus carinatus (Röding, 1798)

Solaropsidae
Gastropod genera